Tactical Airborne Platform for Aerial Surveillance-Beyond Horizon-201 or TAPAS BH-201 ("Heat") (formerly referred to as Rustom-II) is a medium-altitude long-endurance (MALE) unmanned aerial vehicle (UAV) being developed in India by Aeronautical Development Establishment (ADE) on the lines of General Atomics MQ-1 Predator. 

The first flight of the UAV took place in November 2016.

Design
In October, 2010 a senior DRDO official had stated that the General Atomics MQ-1 Predator is an obvious template for the Rustom program. DRDO built a credible unmanned flying platform. The way the Americans converted a robust surveillance drone into a combat drone is something we are confident we can replicate for the Rustom-H. It will have a great deal of mission flexibility.

In February 2012, ADE Director P S Krishnan stated that designing of Rustom-II has been completed, purchase orders have been placed and we are on schedule to fly for the first time in February 2014. In contrast to Rustom-I, the next generation version is equipped with enhanced aerodynamic configuration, digital flight control, navigation system, communication intelligence, medium and long-range electro-optic payloads and synthetic aperture radar that will enable it to see through the clouds. Rustom-2 is capable of carrying different combinations of payloads depending on the mission objectives including electronic intelligence systems and situational awareness systems. It has a satellite communication link to relay situation in the battle theatre on real time basis.

The project started at the cost of ₹1,540.74 crore but later revised to ₹1,786 crore as of 2022.

Development
In September 2013, the Rustom-II began full power taxi trials at the Kolar airfield near Bengaluru. It would carry out intelligence, surveillance and reconnaissance (ISR) roles for all the three armed forces in India. Once inducted, this indigenous medium altitude long endurance (MALE) multirole drone is likely to be an asset for Indian armed forces for its surveillance capability as well as for its use as an unmanned armed combat vehicle.

TAPAS-BH-201 had a successful maiden flight on 16 November 2016 at Challakere, 200 km away from Bengaluru in the district of Chitradurga in south Indian state of Karnataka. It was tested for take off, landing and other parameters. Ten pilotless UAV's would be produced in one year. Nine prototypes more advanced than the initial one would follow for testing prior to the beginning of certification process. Initially DRDO Chief S. Christopher denied arming Rustom-II. There was news of Rustom-II using power plant of Austro Engine but no confirmation from DRDO side considering a Chinese company Wanfeng Auto Holding Group acquired it through Diamond Aircraft Industries in 2016. 

Although it was reported that from prototype AF-5, ADE replaced 125 hp Rotax 914 with 180 hp engine from Austro. ADE was also planning to use 200 hp power plant from Lycoming Engines to improve power-to-weight ratio. In the meantime, Vehicle Research and Development Establishment (VRDE) and Tech Mahindra started working on an indigenous engine for Rustom-II.

During the test phase, five additional prototypes were manufactured close to production variant powered by twin NPO-Saturn 36MT turboprop engines rated 74.57 kW (100 hp). ADE is also trying to decrease weight of Rustom-II by 260 kg. The platform is now being developed as a long endurance surveillance platform capable of deploying precision weapons. With an overall length of 9.5 m and a wingspan of more than 20.6 m, the UCAV needs a runway to takeoff and land unlike traditional UAVs. Initially 1,800 kg was planned but the prototypes are weighing 2,200 kg. Rustom-II has a cruising speed of 135 kt carrying 350 kg of payload.

The drone can loiter autonomously at high altitudes performing real-time, high-resolution intelligence, surveillance and reconnaissance (ISR) with its SAR and EO sensors. When a target is identified, it will either illuminate the target with a laser designator for other strike aircraft, or descend to lower altitude and attack the target with its own air-to-surface missiles.

Combat Vehicles Research and Development Establishment (CVRDE) successfully conducted low speed and high speed taxi trial of Tricycle Nose Wheel Type Retractable Landing Gear System for Rustom-2 at Chitradurga on 2 August 2018. Rustom-2 prototype AF-6 was crashed on 17 September 2019 due to link loss with the ground station that activated 'return home mode' but rough turbulence beyond the capacity of control law made the platform unstable. This problem was later rectified in prototype AF-6A with upgraded features like a solid state relay-based low weight power distribution unit, an indigenous inertial navigation system and lithium ion batteries with satellite communication (SATCOM) link.

DRDO flight tested the Rustom-2 and achieved eight hours of flying at an altitude of 16,000 ft at Chitradurga, Karnataka in October 2020. The prototype expected to achieve an altitude of 26,000 ft and endurance of 18 hours by the end of 2020. Till now Rustom-2 completed 77 developmental test flights.

On 13 November 2021, Rustom-2 demonstrated autonomous take-off and landing capability using GPS-aided GEO augmented navigation (GAGAN). It has T-shaped tail assembly and shoulder-mounted wings to improve perceptibility of payloads. The platform uses Tricycle Nose Wheel Type Retractable Landing Gear System which is designed for high touchdown speeds and sink velocity during landing. On 16 December 2021, TAPAS-BH-201 successfully crossed 25,000 ft and 10 hours endurance milestone. In March 2022, TAPAS-BH-201 successfully demonstrated 28,000 ft and 18 hours of endurance. The Indian Armed Forces are impressed by the advance ground control and image exploitation system of Rustom-2. 

In May 2022, TAPAS-BH-201 system will be handed over to Hindustan Aeronautics Limited (HAL) and Bharat Electronics Limited (BEL) for limited production.

Manufacturing 
As per chairman and managing director of HAL, R Madhavan, six air-frames will be made in 2022 for user evaluation trials in which platform must reach 30,000 ft with an endurance greater than 16 hours. By 2023, DRDO will complete all development work related to Rustom-2 and HAL will start mass production after the completion of user trials. ADE will train HAL technicians for the integration of first two units and later monitor the production process for quality control. 

The final product will have combat range of 250 km. A total of 76 TAPAS drones will be inducted initially into the armed forces in which 60 is for Army, 12 for Air Force and 4 for Navy.

Specifications

See also

References 

Unmanned military aircraft of India
Proposed vehicles